The Pemberton-Billing P.B.9 was a First World War British single-seat open cockpit equal span biplane scout aircraft  built by Pemberton-Billing Limited, which later became the Supermarine Aviation Works. Only one P.B.9 was built.

Design and development 
The wings had full span spars with the upper and lower wings connected by four pairs of interplane struts. The fuselage had a fixed landing gear with a tail skid. 
While designed to allow the use of Grome 80 hp engine the prototype P.B.9 was powered by a 50 hp (36 kW) Gnome rotary engine taken from the company's prototype P.B.1.
 
Using a set of wings that had been obtained from Radley-England it was designed, built and made its first flight within nine days, though for publicity reasons its designer Noel Pemberton Billing claimed it had taken a week (giving rise to the nickname "Seven Day Bus"). It was first flown August 1914. 

Although the aircraft performed well only the prototype was built which was later used by the Royal Naval Air Service as a trainer.

Operators 

 Royal Naval Air Service

Specifications

Notes

References

See also

1910s British military reconnaissance aircraft
Biplanes
Single-engined tractor aircraft
Aircraft first flown in 1914